Aha Naa Pellanta may refer to:
 A song from the soundtrack album of the 1957 film Mayabazar 
 Aha Naa-Pellanta! (1987 film), a 1987 Telugu-language comedy film
 Aha Naa Pellanta! (2011 film), a 2011 Telugu-language comedy film
 Aha Naa Pellanta (web series), a 2022 Telugu-language comedy web series